The Gomphrenoideae are a subfamily of the Amaranthaceae.

The stamens have anthers with only one lobe (locule) and two pollen sacs. Many species show C4-photosynthesis pathway.

The center of diversity lies in Central America, Mexico and the dry forests and thorn bush savannas of South America.

Systematics 
The subfamily Gomphrenoideae was first published in 1893 by Hans Schinz (in: Engler und Prantl (Eds.): Die Natürlichen Pflanzenfamilien vol. 3, 1a, p. 97).

According to phylogenetic research by Sanchez Del-Pino (2009), the subfamily Gomphrenoideae Schinz is regarded as a monophyletic taxon with 19 genera and about 300-400 species. The traditional classification with two tribes (Gomphreneae and Pseudoplantageae) does not reflect the phylogenetic relationship in this group. Three clades can be recognized.:

Iresinoids
 Irenella Suess., with only one species:
 Irenella chrysotricha Suess., in rain forests of Ecuador. Phylogenetically, it falls within Iresine.
 Iresine P.Browne (Syn.: Dicraurus Hook. f.): with about 45 species in North and South America.
 Woehleria Griseb.: with only one species
 Woehleria serpyllifolia Griseb., on mountain coasts of Cuba. Phylogenetically, it falls within Iresine.
This is the sister clade of the two other clades.

Alternantheroids
 Alternanthera Forssk. (Syn.: Brandesia Mart.): with about 100-200 species, mainly in America, also in Africa and Australia.
 Pedersenia Holub: with about 10 species in tropical America.
 Tidestromia Standl.: with about 6 species in deserts of southern North America.
 carbon fixation evolved independently in the genera Alternathera, which also contains  and – intermediate species, and Tidestromia.

Gomphrenoids
 Blutaparon Raf. (Syn.: Philoxerus R.Br.): with about 5 species at shores of North and Middle America, West Africa, Micronesia and Japan, for example:
 Blutaparon rigidum
 Froelichia Moench: with about 12 species in America.
 Froelichiella R.E.Fr., with only one species:
 Froelichiella grisea R.E.Fr. in Brasília.
 Gomphrena L. (Syn.: Bragantia Vand.): with about 90 species in America and about 30 species in Australia. This genus is polyphyletic, so taxonomical changes have to be expected.
 Gomphrena pulchella
 Gomphrena decumbens
 Gomphrena globosa
 Gossypianthus Hook.: with 2 species in southern North America.
 Guilleminea Kunth (Syn.: Brayulinea Small)
 Hebanthe Mart.: with about 7 species in tropical America.
 Hebanthodes Pedersen, with only one species:
 Hebanthodes peruviana Pedersen in Peru.
 Lithophila Sw., with 2 species on Galapagos and the Caribic
 Pfaffia Mart.: with about 35 species in tropical America.
 Pseudogomphrena R.E.Fr.,with only one species:
 Pseudogomphrena scandens R.E.Fr. in Brasília.
 Pseudoplantago Suess.: with one species in Venezuela and one in Argentina.
 Quaternella Pedersen: with 3 species in Brasília.
 Xerosiphon Turcz.: with about 2 species in Brasília.
One large clade within this group, containing the genera Froelichia, Guilleminea, Blutaparon, some Gomphrena species, and probably Gossypianthus and Lithophila, has acquired the  carbon fixation pathway. Some of these  species occur at unusually high altitudes in the Andes, in cooler conditions than their  relatives.

Photographs

References 
 

Amaranthaceae
Caryophyllales subfamilies